Tarragonès is a comarca (county) in Catalonia, Spain. It is one of the three comarques formed in the 1936 comarcal division of Camp de Tarragona. It lies on the Mediterranean coast, between the comarques of Baix Penedès to the northeast and Baix Camp to the south. Over 60% of the population live in the capital, Tarragona.

Transport
An excellent road network connects the villages of the comarca.   The AP-7/E-15 motorway cuts across the region, following the coastline.   The port of Tarragona is an important Mediterranean transit point.   There are yacht marinas in Tarragona and Torredembarra, with a smaller one at Salou.   There is a rail connection with the cities of Barcelona and Valencia.

Municipalities

References

External links
Official comarcal web site (in Catalan)

 
Comarques of the Province of Tarragona